Chard or Swiss chard (Beta vulgaris subsp. vulgaris, Cicla Group and Flavescens Group) is a green leafy vegetable. In the cultivars of the Flavescens Group, the leaf stalks are large and often prepared separately from the leaf blade; the Cicla Group is the leafy spinach beet. The leaf blade can be green or reddish; the leaf stalks are usually white, yellow or red.

Chard, like other green leafy vegetables, has highly nutritious leaves. Chard has been used in cooking for centuries, but because it is the same species as beetroot, the common names that cooks and cultures have used for chard may be confusing; it has many common names, such as silver beet, perpetual spinach, beet spinach, seakale beet, or leaf beet.

Classification
Chard was first described in 1753 by Carl Linnaeus as Beta vulgaris var. cicla. Its taxonomic rank has changed many times: it has been treated as a subspecies, a convariety, and a variety of Beta vulgaris. (Among the numerous synonyms for it are Beta vulgaris subsp. cicla (L.) W.D.J. Koch (Cicla Group), B. vulgaris subsp. cicla (L.) W.D.J. Koch var. cicla L., B. vulgaris var. cycla (L.) Ulrich, B. vulgaris subsp. vulgaris (Leaf Beet Group), B. vulgaris subsp. vulgaris (Spinach Beet Group), B. vulgaris subsp. cicla (L.) W.D.J. Koch (Flavescens Group), B. vulgaris subsp. cicla (L.) W.D.J. Koch var. flavescens (Lam.) DC., B. vulgaris L. subsp. vulgaris (Leaf Beet Group), B. vulgaris subsp. vulgaris (Swiss Chard Group)). The accepted name for all beet cultivars, like chard, sugar beet and beetroot, is Beta vulgaris subsp. vulgaris. They are cultivated descendants of the sea beet, Beta vulgaris subsp. maritima. Chard belongs to the chenopods, which are now mostly included in the family Amaranthaceae (sensu lato).

The two rankless cultivar groups for chard are the Cicla Group for the leafy spinach beet and the Flavescens Group for the stalky Swiss chard.

Etymology
The word "chard" descends from the 14th-century French carde, from Latin carduus meaning artichoke thistle (or cardoon, including the artichoke).

The origin of the adjective "Swiss" is unclear, since this coastal plant is native to Sicily, not Switzerland. Some attribute the name to it having been first described by a Swiss botanist, either Gaspard Bauhin or Karl Koch (although the latter was German, not Swiss). Chard is, however, used in traditional Swiss cuisine, in a dish called capuns from the canton of Grisons.

Growth and harvesting

Chard is a biennial. Clusters of chard seeds are usually sown, in the Northern Hemisphere between June and October, depending on the desired harvesting period. Chard can be harvested while the leaves are young and tender or after maturity when they are larger and have slightly tougher stems. Harvesting is a continuous process, as most species of chard produce three or more crops.

Cultivars
Cultivars of chard include green forms, such as 'Lucullus' and 'Fordhook Giant,' as well as red-ribbed forms, such as 'Ruby Chard' and 'Rhubarb Chard.'  The red-ribbed forms are attractive in the garden, but as a general rule, the older green forms tend to outproduce the colorful hybrids. 'Rainbow Chard' is a mix of colored varieties often mistaken for a variety unto itself.

Chard has shiny, green, ribbed leaves, with petioles that range in color from white to yellow to red, depending on the cultivar.

Chard may be harvested in the garden all summer by cutting individual leaves as needed. It does not bolt. In the Northern Hemisphere, chard is typically ready to harvest as early as April and lasts until there is a hard frost, typically below 25 degrees. It is one of the hardier leafy greens, with a harvest season that typically lasts longer than that of kale, spinach, or baby greens.

Culinary use
Fresh chard can be used raw in salads, stirfries, soups or omelets. The raw leaves can be used like a tortilla wrap. Chard leaves and stalks are typically boiled or sautéed; the bitterness fades with cooking.

Nutritional content

In a  serving, raw Swiss chard provides  of food energy and has rich content (> 19% of the Daily Value, DV) of vitamins A, K, and C, with 122%, 1038%, and 50%, respectively, of the DV. Also having significant content in raw chard are dietary fiber, vitamin K and the dietary minerals magnesium, manganese, iron, and potassium. Raw chard has a low content of carbohydrates, protein, and fat.

Cooked chard is 93% water, 4% carbohydrates, 2% protein, and contains negligible fat. In a reference 100 g serving, cooked chard supplies 20 calories, with vitamin and mineral contents reduced compared to raw chard, but still present in significant proportions of the DV, especially for vitamin A, vitamin K, vitamin C, and magnesium (table).

References

Leaf vegetables
Beta (plant)
Edible plants